HMS Immortalité has been the name of more than one ship of the British Royal Navy, and may refer to:

 HMS Immortalité, a 38-gun fifth rate, formerly the French Infatigable, captured from France in 1806 and scrapped in 1811.
 HMS Immortalité (1814), a 38-gun fifth rate, formerly the French Alcmène, captured from France in 1814 and renamed HMS Dunira, renamed HMS Immortalité later in 1814, and sold in 1837
 , a wooden screw frigate launched in 1859 and sold in 1883
 , an armored cruiser launched in 1887 and sold for scrapping in 1907

See also
 

Royal Navy ship names